The brown-bellied stipplethroat or brown-bellied antwren (Epinecrophylla gutturalis) is a species of bird in the family Thamnophilidae.

It is found in Brazil, French Guiana, Guyana, Suriname, and Venezuela. Its natural habitat is subtropical or tropical moist lowland forests.

The brown-bellied stipplethroat was described by the English ornithologists Philip Sclater and Osbert Salvin in 1881 and given the binomial name Myrmotherula gutturalis. The present genus Epinecrophylla was introduced in 2006.

References

 Isler, M., D. Lacerda, P. Isler, S. Hackett, K. Rosenberg, and R. Brumfield (2006). Epinecrophylla, a new genus of antwrens (Aves: Passeriformes: Thamnophilidae). Proceedings of the Biological Society of Washington 119(4): 522-527

brown-bellied stipplethroat
Birds of the Brazilian Amazon
Birds of the Guianas
brown-bellied stipplethroat
brown-bellied stipplethroat
brown-bellied stipplethroat
Taxonomy articles created by Polbot